Ricky Swallow is an Australian sculptor (born in San Remo, Victoria in 1974), who lives and works in Los Angeles. He creates detailed pieces and installations in a variety of media, often utilising objects of everyday life as well as the body (bones etc.). He studied at the Victorian College of the Arts. He won the Contempora 5 Prize in Melbourne at the age of 25 in 1999. He was later selected to be the Australian representative at the 2005 Venice Biennale with This Time Another Year.

See also
Art of Australia
1993–1997 Bachelor of Fine Art, Major: Drawing, Victorian College of the Arts in Melbourne, Australia

References

1974 births
Living people
Australian contemporary artists
20th-century Australian sculptors
Victorian College of the Arts alumni
21st-century Australian sculptors